Sylvie Verheyde (born 1967) is a French film director, actress, and screenwriter.

Director
The films Verheyde has directed include Un frère (1997), in which Emma de Caunes won a César Award for Most Promising Actress, Princesses (2000), Amour de Femme (2001), Stella (2008) and Confession of a Child of the Century (2011), starring Pete Doherty, which was screened at the 2012 Cannes Film Festival, Sex Doll (2016; she also wrote the screenplay for this film), and directed  Madame Claude (2021).

With Sylvie Ohayon, she co-wrote the screenplay of the 2021 film Haute Couture.

The movies Stella (2008) and Stella In Love (2022) are both references to Verheyde's childhood. Sex Doll (2016) and Madame Claude (2021) are both movies about prostitution, again a topic close to Verheyde as her grandmother and one of her cousin were prostitutes.

Awards
Best Director for Sang froid at Television Festival of La Rochelle, 2007
Lina Mangiacapre Award and Christopher D. Smithers Foundation Special Award, at the 65th Venice International Film Festival, for Stella

See also
 List of female film and television directors
 List of LGBT-related films directed by women

References

External links
 

1967 births
Living people
French film actresses
French women screenwriters
French screenwriters
French women film directors
French film directors
Place of birth missing (living people)